The Ambazonia Restoration Army (ARA) is an Ambazonian separatist militia. It is affiliated with the Interim Government of Ambazonia, and is part of the Ambazonia Self-Defence Council.

The ARA is reportedly led by Paxson Agbor, a former police officer.

See also
Communes of Cameroon

References 

 

Military of Ambazonia
National liberation movements in Africa
Secessionist organizations